Richard James Wamsley (born May 25, 1959) is a Canadian former professional ice hockey goaltender who played in the National Hockey League for the Montreal Canadiens, St. Louis Blues, Calgary Flames and Toronto Maple Leafs. He was the goaltending coach for the NHL's Ottawa Senators until his firing by new general manager Pierre Dorion on April 12, 2016.

Drafted by the Montreal Canadiens in 1979, Wamsley played with the Nova Scotia Voyageurs before being called up to the big team. He spent three successful seasons in Montreal before being shipped to St. Louis in exchange for the draft picks which the Canadiens would ultimately use to select future players Shayne Corson and Stéphane Richer.

Wamsley and Denis Herron shared the William M. Jennings Trophy with Montreal in 1982. Wamsley was traded to the Calgary Flames with Rob Ramage for Brett Hull and would be a part of their Stanley Cup team in 1989. He previously served as a goaltending coach for the St. Louis Blues and pro scout and goaltending coach with the Columbus Blue Jackets. Prior to joining the Blue Jackets, Wamsley spent six seasons as a member of the Toronto Maple Leafs organization. While in Toronto, he served as a pro and amateur scout in 1998–99 and was an assistant coach under Pat Burns from 1996–98. Wamsley joined the Leafs' organization as a goaltending consultant immediately after retiring from playing following the 1992–93 season. On July 28, 2010, Wamsley joined the Ottawa Senators organization in the capacity of goaltending coach.

Career statistics

Regular season and playoffs

International

References
Career statistics:

External links 

1959 births
Living people
Brantford Alexanders players
Calgary Flames players
Canadian ice hockey goaltenders
Columbus Blue Jackets coaches
Columbus Blue Jackets scouts
Hamilton Fincups players
Ice hockey people from Ontario
Montreal Canadiens draft picks
Montreal Canadiens players
Nova Scotia Voyageurs players
Ottawa Senators coaches
St. John's Maple Leafs players
St. Louis Blues coaches
St. Louis Blues players
Sportspeople from Norfolk County, Ontario
Stanley Cup champions
Toronto Maple Leafs coaches
Toronto Maple Leafs players
Toronto Maple Leafs scouts
William M. Jennings Trophy winners
Canadian ice hockey coaches